James F. Proctor (born 1892) was a professional footballer, who played for Huddersfield Town and Leicester Fosse.

References

1892 births
Year of death missing
English footballers
Footballers from Greater London
Association football forwards
English Football League players
Huddersfield Town A.F.C. players
Leicester City F.C. players